Tә́la  is the name of the seventh month of the Afghan calendar. It occurs in the autumn season (from September 22/23 to October 21/22) and contains 30 days.

Təla corresponds with the tropical Zodiac sign Libra. Təә́a literally means "weighing scale" in Pashto.

Holidays 
 German Unity Day - 11/12 Tala 
 National Day of the Republic of China - 16 or 17 Tala 
 Columbus Day and National Day of Spain -20 or 21 Tala
 United States Navy Birthday - 21 or 22 Tala
 Bhumibol Adulyadej Death Anniversary Memorial Day - 23 Tala

Pashto names for the months of the Solar Hijri calendar

ps:تله(مياشت)